David Baker (born December 27, 1954; Bangor, Maine) is an American poet. He is Emeritus Professor of English at Denison University where he still teaches.  He served for more than 25 years as poetry editor of the Kenyon Review and continues to curate "Nature's Nature" for the magazine.

Life
David Baker was born in Bangor, Maine, in 1954, and was raised in Missouri. He graduated from Central Missouri State University and from the University of Utah with a Ph.D. in 1983.

He has taught widely, including at Jefferson City (MO) Senior High School, Kenyon College, the University of Michigan, Ohio State University, and since 1984 at Denison University, in Granville, Ohio, where he held the Thomas B. Fordham Chair of Creative Writing and is Emeritus Professor of English. He teaches regularly in the MFA Program for Writers at Warren Wilson College and serves on the faculty of many writing workshops around the country.

His work has appeared in The Atlantic Monthly, The Nation, The New Republic,The New York Times, The New Yorker, The Paris Review, Poetry, The Yale Review.

He lives in Granville, Ohio, and serves as Poetry Editor of The Kenyon Review.

Awards 
 2011 Theodore Roethke Memorial Poetry Prize.
 2001 Guggenheim Fellow.
 National Endowment for the Arts, 2005 & 1985
 Ohio Arts Council.
 Poetry Society of America Lyric Prize.
 Society of Midland Authors.
 Pushcart Foundation.

Poetry Volumes 
 Whale Fall (W. W. Norton, 2022)
 Swift: New and Selected Poems (W. W. Norton, 2019)
 Scavenger Loop (W. W. Norton, 2015)
 Never-Ending Birds (W. W. Norton, 2009)
 Omul Alchimic trans. by Chris Tanasescu (Vinea, 2009)
 Treatise on Touch: Selected Poems (Arc Publications, 2007)
 Midwest Eclogue (W. W. Norton, 2005)
 Changeable Thunder (University of Arkansas, 2001)
 The Truth about Small Towns (University of Arkansas, 1998)
 After the Reunion (University of Arkansas, 1994)
 Sweet Home, Saturday Night (University of Arkansas, 1991)
 Haunts (Cleveland State University, 1985
 Laws of the Land, (Ahsahta/Boise State University 1981)

Prose Volumes 
 Seek After: On Seven Modern Lyric Poets (Stephen F. Austin, 2018)
 Show Me Your Environment: Essays on Poetry, Poets, and Poems (University of Michigan, 2014)
 Talk Poetry: Poems and Interviews with Nine American Poets (University of Arkansas, 2010)
 Radiant Lyre: Essays on Lyric Poetry (Graywolf, 2007)
 Heresy and the Ideal: On Contemporary Poetry (University of Arkansas, 2000)
 Meter in English: A Critical Engagement (University of Arkansas, 1996).

References 

Writers from Bangor, Maine
1954 births
Poets from Maine
University of Central Missouri alumni
University of Utah alumni
University of Michigan faculty
Denison University faculty
Living people
Poets from Ohio
People from Granville, Ohio